The chupacabra or chupacabras (literally 'goat-sucker'; from , 'to suck', and , 'goats') is a legendary creature in the folklore of parts of the Americas, with its first purported sightings reported in Puerto Rico in 1995. The name comes from the animal's reported vampirism—the chupacabra is said to attack and drink the blood of livestock, including goats.

Physical descriptions of the creature vary, some describe it as reptilian and alien-like (in Puerto Rico and Latin America), generally as a heavy creature the size of a small bear with a row of spines reaching from the neck to the base of the tail. Others depict it as more dog-like (particularly in Southwestern United States).

Sightings have been reported in Puerto Rico since the 1970s. The creature has since been reported as far north as Maine, as far south as Chile, and even outside the Americas in countries like Russia and Philippines. All of the reports are anecdotal and have been disregarded as uncorroborated or lacking evidence. Sightings in northern Mexico and the southern United States have been verified as canids afflicted by mange. According to biologists and wildlife management officials, the chupacabra is an urban legend.

Name 
It is known as both  and  throughout the Americas, with the former being the original name, and the latter a regularization. The name is attributed to Puerto Rican comedian Silverio Pérez, who coined the label in 1995 while commenting on the attacks as a San Juan radio deejay.

History 
Initially, it was suspected that the killings were committed by a Satanic cult; later more killings were reported around the island, and many farms reported loss of animal life. Each of the animals was reported to have had its body bled dry through a series of small circular incisions.

The first reported attack eventually attributed to the actual chupacabras occurred in March 1995. Eight sheep were discovered dead in Puerto Rico, each with three puncture wounds in the chest area and reportedly completely drained of blood. A few months later, in August, an eyewitness named Madelyne Tolentino reported seeing the creature in the Puerto Rican town of Canóvanas, where as many as 150 farm animals and pets were reportedly killed.

Puerto Rican comedian and entrepreneur Silverio Pérez is credited with coining the term  soon after the first incidents were reported in the press. Shortly after the first reported incidents in Puerto Rico, other animal deaths were reported in other countries, such as Argentina, Bolivia, Brazil, Chile, Colombia, Dominican Republic, El Salvador, Honduras, Mexico, Nicaragua, Panama, Peru, and the United States.

In October and December 2018, there came many reports of suspected chupacabras in Manipur, India. Many domestic animals and poultry were killed in a suspicious manner similar to other chupacabra attacks, and several people reported that they had seen chupacabras. However, forensic experts opined that street dogs were responsible for mass killing of domestic animals and poultry after studying the remnants of a corpse.

In October 2019, a video recorded by  showed the results of a supposed attack on chickens in the Seburuquillo sector of Lares, Puerto Rico.

Reputed origin 
A five-year investigation by Benjamin Radford, documented in his 2011 book Tracking the Chupacabra, concluded that the description given by the original eyewitness in Puerto Rico, Madelyne Tolentino, was based on the creature Sil in the 1995 science-fiction horror film Species. The alien creature Sil is nearly identical to Tolentino's chupacabra eyewitness account and she had seen the movie before her report: "It was a creature that looked like the chupacabra, with spines on its back and all... The resemblance to the chupacabra was really impressive", Tolentino reported. Radford revealed that Tolentino "believed that the creatures and events she saw in Species were happening in reality in Puerto Rico at the time", and therefore concludes that "the most important chupacabra description cannot be trusted". This, Radford believes, seriously undermines the credibility of the chupacabra as a real animal.

In addition, the reports of blood-sucking by the chupacabra were never confirmed by a necropsy, the only way to conclude that the animal was drained of blood. Dr. David Morales, a Puerto Rican veterinarian with the Department of Agriculture, analyzed 300 reported victims of the chupacabra and found that they had not been bled dry.

Radford divided the chupacabra reports into two categories: the reports from Puerto Rico and Latin America, where animals were attacked and it is supposed their blood was extracted; and the reports in the United States of mammals, mostly dogs and coyotes with mange, that people call "chupacabra" due to their unusual appearance.

In late October 2010, University of Michigan biologist Barry O'Connor concluded that all the chupacabra reports in the United States were simply coyotes infected with the parasite Sarcoptes scabiei, whose symptoms would explain most of the features of the chupacabra: they would be left with little fur, thickened skin, and a rank odor. O'Connor theorized that the attacks on goats occurred "because these animals are greatly weakened, [so] they're going to have a hard time hunting. So they may be forced into attacking livestock because it's easier than running down a rabbit or a deer."

Although several witnesses came to the conclusion that the attacks could not be the work of dogs or coyotes because they had not eaten the victim, this conclusion is incorrect. Both dogs and coyotes can kill and not consume the prey, either because they are inexperienced, or due to injury or difficulty in killing the prey. The prey can survive the attack and die afterwards from internal bleeding or circulatory shock. The presence of two holes in the neck, corresponding with the canine teeth, are to be expected since this is the only way that most land carnivores have to catch their prey.

There are reports of stray Mexican hairless dogs being mistaken for chupacabras.

Appearance 
The most common description of the chupacabra is that of a reptile-like creature, said to have leathery or scaly greenish-gray skin and sharp spines or quills running down its back.

Another common description of the chupacabra is of a strange breed of wild dog. This form is mostly hairless and has a pronounced spinal ridge, unusually pronounced eye sockets, fangs, and claws. Unlike conventional predators, the chupacabra is said to drain all of the animal's blood (and sometimes organs) usually through three holes in the shape of a downwards-pointing triangle, but sometimes through only one or two holes.

Related legends 

The "Ozark Howler", a large bear-like animal, is the subject of a similar urban legend.

The Peuchens of Chile also share similarities in their supposed habits, but instead of being dog-like they are described as winged snakes. This legend may have originated from the vampire bat, an animal endemic to the region.

In the Philippines, another legendary creature called the Sigbin shares many of the chupacabra's descriptions.

"Grunches" is a legend in New Orleans that gets its name from a lovers' lane called Grunch Road, between the Mississippi river and the Gulf of Mexico. The road was said to be inhabited by creatures called "grunches", similar in appearance to the Chupacabra.

In popular culture 
The popularity of the chupacabra has resulted in it being featured in many types of media.
 The debut album of Imani Coppola is titled Chupacabra.
 In the 2014 horror film Indigenous, the chupacabra is the main antagonist.
 The myth of the chupacabra is mocked in the 2012 episode "Jewpacabra" of the cartoon series South Park in which antisemitic main character Eric Cartman claims to have seen a Jewish Chupacabra that kills children on Easter.
 The Magic: The Gathering set "Rivals of Ixalan" introduced a card named "Ravenous Chupacabra" in January 2018.
 The Chupacabra was included as one of several vinyl figurines in Cryptozoic Entertainment's Cryptkins blind box toy line in 2018. A redesigned series of figurines, including an updated Chupacabra, was released in August 2020.
 A chupacabra attacks Dr. Venture in the Dia de los Dangerous! episode of The Venture Bros
 The search for a chupacabra was featured in the 1997 The X-Files episode "El Mundo Gira".
 "Chupacabra" was the title of the midseason finale of season 4 of the supernatural drama television series Grimm in December 2014.
 Tensou Sentai Goseiger has the main antagonist named Brajira dressed in a house centipede/chupacabra-themed armor to infiltrate the Yuumajuu, a team of cryptid-themed monsters.
 Teen Titans Academy, a DC Comics book has a bat-like metahuman called 'Chupacabra' whose alter-ego is Diego Pérez, named in honour of George Pérez (the artist that initially illustrated the Teen Titans).
 A 1999 episode of Futurama features a monster called "El Chupanibre".
 In season 3 of Workaholics called "To Kill A Chupacabraj" Blake finds what he believes to be the deceased corpse of the Rancho Chupacabra in the pool, though it turns out to be the neighbor's dog.
 In the Netflix original series The Imperfects, the character of Juan Ruiz transforms into a chupacabra whenever anyone he cares about is in danger.

See also 
 Cattle mutilation
 Scientific skepticism

References

External links 

 Alleged chupacabra likely a "Xolo dog"; story a hoax
 
 Chupacabra mystery solved from Seeker.com
 Ooty: Kangaroo cousin lived in western ghats?
 

American legendary creatures
Mythology of the Americas
Latin American legendary creatures
Mythological hematophages
Supernatural legends
Puerto Rican folklore
1995 in Puerto Rico
Cryptids